Balmain Australian Football Club is a NSWFL foundation Australian Football club competing in the Sydney AFL Premier League and based out of the Sydney suburb of Balmain.

The team train at Glover st Oval in Lilyfield from 6pm on Tuesdays and Thursdays.

Home games are currently at HJ Mahoney Park in Marrickville.

History
The club formed in 1903 as the Balmain Football Club, a founding member of the Sydney Football League.

The Tigers won the Sydney AFL flag most recently in 2014.

Famous players

Sydney Swans player Troy Luff played for Balmain after retiring from the Australian Football League from 2002 onward. Rugby league player Wally Messenger (the brother of Dally Messenger) played for the club in its early days.

Players to make VFL/AFL level from the Balmain Tigers over the years included John Stephenson (1907, Essendon), Charles Brown (1916–1923, Collingwood) Jack Armstrong (1925, St Kilda), Neil Davies (1955, Richmond), Paul Feltham (1970–78, North Melbourne, Richmond) and Ray Hall (1999, Richmond).

In 2010 and 2011 Nic Fosdike (Sydney Swans) was the senior playing coach while Nick Davis (Sydney Swans), Jason Saddington (Sydney Swans) and Chad Fletcher (West Coast Eagles) played alongside Fosdike.

In 2014 the club broke a 16-year drought to take out the Division 1 premiership

External links

 
 Full Points Footy profile for Balmain Tigers

Australian rules football clubs in Sydney
Australian rules football clubs established in 1903
1903 establishments in Australia
Balmain, New South Wales